The Age of Aquarius, in astrology, is either the current or forthcoming astrological age, depending on the method of calculation. Astrologers maintain that an astrological age is a product of the earth's slow precessional rotation and lasts for 2,160 years, on average (one Great Year equals 25,920-year period of precession / 12 zodiac signs = 2,160 years).

There are various methods of calculating the boundaries of an astrological age. In sun-sign astrology, the first sign is Aries, followed by Taurus, Gemini, Cancer, Leo, Virgo, Libra, Scorpio, Sagittarius, Capricorn, Aquarius, and Pisces, whereupon the cycle returns to Aries and through the zodiacal signs again. Astrological ages proceed in the opposite direction. Therefore, the Age of Aquarius follows the Age of Pisces.

Overview
The approximate 2,160 years for each age corresponds to the average time it takes for the vernal equinox to move from one constellation of the zodiac into the next. This average can be computed by dividing the earth's 25,800 year gyroscopic precession period by 12, the number of zodiacal signs. This is only a rough calculation, as the length of time it takes for a complete precession is currently increasing. A more accurate set of figures is 25,772 years for a complete cycle and 2,147.5 years per astrological age. According to various astrologers' calculations, approximate dates for entering the Age of Aquarius range from 1447 CE (Terry MacKinnell) to 3597 CE (John Addey).

Astrologers do not agree on when the Aquarian age will start or even if it has already started. Campion (1999) lists various references from mainly astrological sources for the start of the Age of Aquarius. Based on Campion's summary, most published materials on the subject state that the Age of Aquarius arrived in the 20th century (29 claims), with the 24th century in second place with 12 claimants.

Astrological ages are taken to be associated with the precession of the equinoxes. The slow wobble of the earth's rotation axis on the celestial sphere is independent of the diurnal rotation of the earth on its own axis and the annual revolution of the earth around the sun. Traditionally this 25,800 year-long cycle is calibrated, for the purposes of determining astrological ages, by the location of the sun in one of the 12 zodiac constellations at the vernal (Spring) equinox, which corresponds to the moment the sun crosses the celestial equator, marking the start of spring in the Northern Hemisphere each year. Roughly every 2,150 years the sun's position at the time of the vernal equinox will have moved into a new zodiacal constellation.

In 1929 the International Astronomical Union defined the edges of the 88 official constellations. The edge established between Pisces and Aquarius officially locates the beginning of the Aquarian Age around 2600 CE. Many astrologers dispute this approach because of the varying sizes and overlap between the zodiacal constellations. They prefer the long-established convention of equally-sized signs, spaced every 30 degrees along the ecliptic, which are named for the 12 background zodiacal constellations.

Astrological meaning
Astrologers believe that an astrological age affects humanity, possibly by influencing the rise and fall of civilizations or cultural tendencies.

Traditionally, Aquarius is associated with electricity, computers, flight, democracy, freedom, humanitarianism, idealism, modernization, nervous disorders, rebellion, nonconformity, philanthropy, veracity, perseverance, humanity, and irresolution.

Among other dates, one view is that the Age of Aquarius arrived around 1844, with the harbinger of Siyyid ʿAlí Muḥammad (1819–1850), who founded Bábism.

Marcia Moore and Mark Douglas promoted the view that, although no one knows when the Aquarian Age begins, the American Revolution, the Industrial Revolution, and the discovery of electricity are all attributable to the Aquarian Age. Moore and Douglas make a number of predictions about the trends that they believe will develop in the Aquarian Age.

A common position expressed by many astrologers sees the Age of Aquarius as that time when humanity takes control of the Earth and its own destiny as its rightful heritage, with the destiny of humanity being the revelation of truth and the expansion of consciousness, and that some people will experience enlightenment in advance of others and therefore be recognized as the new leaders in the world.

Proponents of medieval astrology suggest that the Pisces world where religion is the opiate of the masses will be replaced in the Aquarian Age by a world ruled by secretive, power-hungry elites seeking absolute power over others; that knowledge in the Aquarian Age will only be valued for its ability to win wars; that knowledge and science will be abused, not industry and trade; and that the Aquarian Age will be a Dark Age in which religion is considered offensive.

Another view suggests that the rise of scientific rationalism, combined with the fall of religious influence, the increasing focus on human rights since the 1780s, the exponential growth of technology, plus the advent of flight and space travel, are evidence of the dawning of the Age of Aquarius.

A "wave" theory of the shifting Great Ages suggests that the Age of Aquarius will not arrive on a given date but is instead emerging in influence over many years, similar to how the tide surges forward incrementally rather than all at once.

Rudolf Steiner believed that the Age of Aquarius will arrive in 3573. In Steiner's approach, each age is exactly 2,160 years. Based on this structure, the world has been in the Age of Pisces since 1413. Rudolf Steiner had spoken about two great spiritual events: the return of Christ in the ethereal world (and not in a physical body), because people must develop their faculties until they can reach the ethereal world; and the incarnation of Ahriman, Zoroaster's "destructive spirit" that will try to block the evolution of humanity.

In an article about feminism in the French newspaper La Fronde from February 26, 1890, August Vandekerkhove stated: "About March, 21st this year the cycle of Aquarius will start. Aquarius is the house of the woman". He adds that is in this age the woman will be equal to the man.

Gnostic philosopher Samael Aun Weor declared February 4, 1962 to be the beginning of the "Age of Aquarius", heralded by the alignment of the first six planets, the Sun, the Moon and the constellation Aquarius.

Common cultural associations
The expression Age of Aquarius in popular culture usually refers to the heyday of the hippie and New Age movements in the 1960s and 1970s.

The 1967 musical Hair, with its opening song "Aquarius" and the line "This is the dawning of the Age of Aquarius", brought the Aquarian age concept to the attention of audiences worldwide. However, the song further defines this dawning of the age within the first lines: "When the Moon is in the seventh house and Jupiter aligns with Mars, then peace will guide the planets and love will steer the stars". Astrologer Neil Spencer denounced the lyrics as "astrological gibberish", noting that Jupiter aligns with Mars several times a year and the Moon is in the 7th House for two hours every day.

These lines are considered by critics to be poetic license, although some people have taken them literally. An example is the identification of Valentine's Day 2009 as the "perfect alignment to support our collective manifestation of love and peace and dawning of the Age of Aquarius".

The music festival commonly known as Woodstock was billed as "An Aquarian Exposition".

See also 

 Aeon (Thelema)
 Axial precession
 Tetramorph

References

External links

Astrological ages
New Age
1960s fads and trends